Monobrachium is a genus of hydroids. These marine cnidarians form the only genus of the monotypic family Monobrachiidae.

Species
The genus contains the following species:
 Monobrachium antarcticum Robins, 1972
 Monobrachium drachi Marche-Marchad, 1963
 Monobrachium parasitum Mereschkowsky, 1877

References

External links
 

Limnomedusae
Hydrozoan genera